Virginia Ruano Pascual and Magüi Serna were the defending champions, but lost in the semifinals to tournament winners Barbara Schwartz and Jasmin Wöhr.

Schwartz and Wöhr won the title by defeating Tathiana Garbin and Arantxa Sánchez Vicario 6–2, 0–6, 6–4 in the final.

Seeds

Draw

Draw

References

External links
 Official results archive (ITF)
 Official results archive (WTA)

WTA Knokke-Heist
2002 WTA Tour